Estella "Stella" Agsteribbe (6 April 1909 – 17 September 1943) was a Dutch gymnast. She won the gold medal as member of the Dutch gymnastics team at the 1928 Summer Olympics in her native Amsterdam. The team was inducted into the International Jewish Sports Hall of Fame in 1997.

Like other members of her team (Lea Nordheim, Ans Polak, Judikje Simons, Elka de Levie) and their coach Gerrit Kleerekoper, she was Jewish and deported during World War II. She was murdered together with her husband Samuel Blits, their six-year-old daughter Nanny and their two-year-old son Alfred in the Auschwitz concentration camp.

See also
 List of select Jewish gymnasts
 List of victims of Nazism
 World War II casualties of Poland

References

Further reading

External links
 
 Estella Agsteribbe commemoration, Yad Vashem website

1909 births
1943 deaths
Dutch people who died in Auschwitz concentration camp
Dutch female artistic gymnasts
Gymnasts at the 1928 Summer Olympics
Jewish gymnasts
Jewish Dutch sportspeople
Olympic gold medalists for the Netherlands
Olympic gymnasts of the Netherlands
Gymnasts from Amsterdam
Dutch civilians killed in World War II
Olympic medalists in gymnastics
International Jewish Sports Hall of Fame inductees
Medalists at the 1928 Summer Olympics
Dutch Jews who died in the Holocaust
20th-century Dutch women
20th-century Dutch people